Imbramowice  is a village in the administrative district of Gmina Trzyciąż, within Olkusz County, Lesser Poland Voivodeship, in southern Poland. Imbramowice is the site of a Premonstratensian (Norbertine) monastery.

The village has a population of 490.

References

Imbramowice